Sylvia Lago Carzolio (born 20 November 1932) is a Uruguayan writer, teacher, and literary critic. She has made a particular focus of women's issues, addressing various conflicts that women encounter in her work.

Biography
Sylvia Lago was born in Montevideo on 20 November 1932. Her great-aunt was professor Elda Lago, a member of the Generación del 45, who bequeathed her home to the University of the Republic (UdelaR). She carried out academic and scientific activities at the Department of Uruguayan and American Literature at UdelaR's Faculty of Humanities and Educational Sciences, eventually becoming its chair.

In 1962, she published her first work, the young adult novel Trajano, which won awards in contests organized by the magazine Número and the Departmental Council of Montevideo. Three years later, she published another novel, Tan solos en el verano. It was followed by La última razón in 1968. Her output was limited in the years after the 1973 coup d'état; she mainly published short story collections, such as Detrás del rojo, Las flores conjuradas, and El corazón de la noche.

In 1988, she published Quince cuentos para una antología. Her 1995 book Días dorados, días en sombra contains works written between 1965 and 1995.

In 2002, her novel Saltos mortales won second prize at the Ministry of Education and Culture's annual literature contest.

She has served as a juror for literary competitions such as the Colihue Young Adult Novel Contest and the Juan Carlos Onetti Literary Contest.

Selected publications
 1962: Trajano, young adult novel, Vol. 115 of Colección Literaria Lyc, Ediciones Colihue SRL, 
 1962: Tan solos en el balneario, Editor Imprenta Panamericana
 1965: Tan solos en el verano, novel
 1968: La última razón, novel, Vol. 58 of Bolsilibros Arca, Editor Arca
 1969: Detrás del rojo, Colección Carabela, Editorial Alfa
 1972: Las flores conjuradas, Colección La Invención, Editorial Giron
 1976: Eduardo Acevedo Díaz: El combate de la tapera, Vol. 28 of Manuales de literatura, Editorial Técnica
 1984: Grafías: revista de los talleristas, with Jorge Arbeleche
 1987: El corazón de la noche, Vol. 9 of Lectores de la Banda Oriental, 4th series, Ediciones de la Banda Oriental
 1988: Quince cuentos para una antología
 1988: La flecha hacia el vacío: introducción a la obra de Leopoldo Lugones, University of the Republic, Department of Uruguayan and American Literature of the Faculty of Humanities and Educational Sciences
 1990: Cuentos de ajustar cuentas, Ediciones Trilce
 1992: Los espacios de la violencia en la narrativa latinoamericana: (Asturias, Rulfo, Acevedo Díaz, Quiroga), Avances de investigación, University of the Republic, Department of Uruguayan and American Literature of the Faculty of Humanities and Educational Sciences
 1994: Modalidades del discurso narrativo uruguayo de las últimas décadas (1960-1980): 1960–73: signos premonitorios, Vol. 1, with Nilo Berriel, Juan Duthu, and Laura Fumagalli; University of the Republic
 1995: Días dorados, días en sombra, short stories, 1965–1995. Biblioteca del Sur, Grupo Editorial Planeta, 
 1996: Mario Benedetti: Cincuenta Años de Creación, Vol. 1 of Escritores Uruguayos, Aproximaciones Series, illustrated edition from the Faculty of Humanities and Educational Sciences of the University of the Republic, 
 1997: Actas de Las Jornadas de Homenaje a Juan Carlos Onetti, illustrated edition from the University of the Republic, Department of Uruguayan and American Literature
 1997: Narrativa uruguaya de las últimas décadas (1960-1990), No. 2 of Escritores uruguayos: Aproximaciones, University of the Republic, 
 1997: Polifonía, with Jorge Arbeleche
 1998: José Saramago en humanidades, 7 de setiembre de 1998, University of the Republic, Faculty of Humanities and Educational Sciences
 1999: Cuentos Fantásticos del Uruguay, Libros del Timbó, with Laura Fumagalli, and Hebert Benítez Pezzolano; Ediciones Colihue, 
 2001: Ocho escritores uruguayos de la resistencia: entrevistas y textos, University of the Republic, 
 2002: Saltos mortales, novel, Biblioteca del Sur, illustrated edition from Editorial Planeta, 
 2002: El cuerpo como espacio político: literatura uruguaya insurrecta, No. 1 of Escritores uruguayos: Aproximaciones, Faculty of Humanities and Educational Sciences
 2007: La adopción y otros relatos: antología personal, Spanish and Ibero-American writers, Editorial Planeta S.A., 
 2009: Cuentos con Secreto, Vol. 1 of Colección Atalaya: Narradores latinoamericanos, Editor Botella al Mar, 
 2011: Penumbras

Chapters of books
 1993: La Muerte hace buena letra, contributors: Mario Benedetti, Omar Prego; 4th edition from Ediciones Trilce, 
 2001: Kongreßschrift; Festschrift, Serie Aproximaciones a autores uruguayos, edited by Sylvia Lago, Alicia Torres, and the University of the Republic Publishing Department,

References

1932 births
Living people
Academic staff of the University of the Republic (Uruguay)
Uruguayan essayists
Uruguayan feminists
Uruguayan literary critics
Uruguayan novelists
Uruguayan writers of young adult literature
Uruguayan women children's writers
Uruguayan women essayists
Uruguayan women novelists
Women literary critics
Writers from Montevideo